Kofçaz is a town and district of Kırklareli Province in the Marmara region of Turkey. The mayor is Ziya Karataş (AKP). The nearby village of Ahlatlı, 30 km away, is the northernmost settlement in the country.

Facts
Kofçaz is a district of the province of Kırklareli in northwestern Turkey neighbouring with Bulgaria. It is situated in a mountainous area in the outskirts of Yıldız (Istranca) mountains at an elevation of 640 m and has one of the lowest population densities in all of Turkey. The population of the district consists of the local Turkish population who call themselves Gacal and the Turkish communities who came after the Balkan defeat. The population of the district is 2.282 (together with the rural population of the district) according to the 2020 census. The climate is typical continental with cold, snowy winters and hot, dry summers. There is no industry. Forestry, agriculture, and cattle raising are the major ways of living.

History
Kofçaz became part of the Ottoman Empire in 1369 and became a district in 1953 with the appointment of a sub-governor (kaymakam). It contains 16 villages and 2 neighborhoods within its administrative zone.

Geography

Climate

References

External links
Kırklareli governor's official website

Populated places in Kırklareli Province
Districts of Kırklareli Province